Israel has numerous minor political parties. Under the proportional representation electoral system used to elect members of the Knesset, parties required only 1% of the vote to win a seat in the legislature until the 1992 elections, when the electoral threshold was increased to 1.5%. this was raised to 3.25% prior to the 2015 elections. This article lists all parties to have contested a Knesset election, but failed to win seats.

References

 Minor